Bapatla district is a district in coastal Andhra in the Indian state of Andhra Pradesh established on 4 April 2022. The administrative headquarter is Bapatla. The district is formed from  part of erstwhile Prakasam district and part of erstwhile Guntur district.

It has an Air Force Station and several universities.

Geography 
This district is surrounded to the north by the Palnadu district, northeast by the Guntur district, south by the Bay of Bengal, west by the Prakasam district and east by the Krishna district.{{unclear

Administrative divisions 

The district has two revenue divisions, namely Bapatla, Chirala and Repalle division, each headed by a sub collector. These revenue divisions are divided into 25 mandals. The district consists of three municipalities and One Nagar Panchayath. Repalle(28 wards), Bapatla (34 wards) and Chirala (33 wards) are the three municipalities & Addanki(20 wards) is the only one Nagar Panchayath.

Politics 

There are one parliamentary and six assembly constituencies in Bapatla district. The parliamentary constituencies are 
The assembly constituencies are

Cities and towns 

Note -

Demographics 

At the time of the 2011 census Bapatla district had a population of 15,86,918, of which 284,114 (17.90%) lived in urban areas. Bapatla had a sex ratio of 1012 females per 1000 males. Scheduled Castes and Scheduled Tribes made up 3,58,655 (22.61%) and 75,838 (4.78%) of the population respectively.

At the time of the 2011 census, 93.00% of the population spoke Telugu and 6.12% Urdu as their first language.

Notable people 

 Pawan Kalyan, film actor
 Daggubati Purandeswari, Member of Parliament, former Central Minister and BJP National Leader
 Daggubati Venkateswara Rao, former State Minister and Member of Parliament
 Kona Prabhakara Rao, former Andhra Pradesh Assembly Speaker, State Minister and Governor
 D. Ramanaidu, Member of Parliament and Film Producer
 Gade Venkata Reddy, former State Minister
 Konijeti Rosaiah, former Chief Minister of Andhra Pradesh and Governor
 Kona Venkat, film writer
 Ummareddy Venkateswarlu, Member of Parliament and former Central Minister
 K. Viswanath, film director
 Chiranjeevi, film actor

References 

Districts of Andhra Pradesh
2022 establishments in Andhra Pradesh